Gondrexange is a commune in the Moselle department in Grand Est in north-eastern France.

Geography 
This municipality is located in the historic region of Lorraine and is part of the pays de Sarrebourg. 

The Gondrexange stream has its source in the commune of Réchicourt-le-Château and flows into the Saar at Imling, after passing through seven communes.

Gondrexange is part of the Lorraine Regional Natural Park.

Although the commune is crossed by the Paris-Strasbourg railway line, its train station is nowadays closed.

Toponymy 
Former names: 1240 : Gundersingen, 1246: Guntersingen, 1401-1402: Gunnedrakin, Gunnedrekin et Gunedrekin, 1460: Gondresenges, Gunderchingen et Gundeschingen, 1461: Gondressanges, 1519: Gondrechingen, 1751: Gunderichingen seu Gondrechanges, 1793: Gondrexauge, 1801: Gondrexange, 1915–1918 et 1940–1944: Gunderchingen.

See also
 Communes of the Moselle department
 Parc naturel régional de Lorraine

References

External links
 

Communes of Moselle (department)